The Countesses and Duchesses of Anjou were the wives of the ruling counts of Anjou and later the nominal French counts and dukes of Anjou.

Countess of Anjou

First creation

House of Ingelger

Plantagenets

Second creation

Capetian House of Anjou

Third creation

House of Valois

Fourth creation

House of Valois

Fifth creation

House of Valois-Anjou

Duchess of Anjou

First creation

House of Valois-Anjou

Second creation

House of Savoy 
None

Third creation

House of Valois-Angoulême 
None

Fourth creation

House of Valois-Angoulême 
None

Fifth creation 
Most dukes actually did marry but only after they ceased to be Dukes of Anjou because it was a tradition to award the son with the title of Duke of Orléans when they marry.

House of Bourbon

See also
List of consorts of Maine
List of Norman consorts
List of English consorts
List of consorts of Provence
List of consorts of Lorraine
List of consorts of Sicily
List of consorts of Naples

Angevin
Angevin

Angevin

 
Lists of French women